Carex makinoensis, also known as tufted rock-living sedge' is a tussock-forming species of perennial sedge in the family Cyperaceae. It is native to parts of South Korea, Taiwan and Japan.

The species was first formally described by the botanist Adrien René Franchet in 1895 as a part of the work Bulletin de la Societe Philomatique de Paris.

See also
List of Carex species

References

makinoensis
Taxa named by Adrien René Franchet
Plants described in 1895
Flora of Japan
Flora of Taiwan
Flora of South Korea